Two ships of the Royal Navy have been named HMS Oracle:

 , an  launched in December 1915 and sold in October 1921.
 , an  launched in 1961 and paid off in 1993.

References
 

Royal Navy ship names